Manuel Muñiz Villa (born 19 May 1983) is a Spanish lawyer, academic administrator, and International Relations scholar and is currently the Provost of IE University and Dean of its School of Global and Public Affairs. 

Muñiz served as the second Secretary of State for Global Spain in the Ministry of Foreign Affairs, European Union and Cooperation from 2020 to 2021. From 2017 to 2020 he served as Dean of the IE School of Global and Public Affairs (IE University) in Madrid, Spain.

Education 
Manuel Muñiz began his studies at Runnymede College in Madrid. He then completed a Juris Doctor and was accepted into the Madrid Bar.

Muñiz furthered his studies with a Master of Science in Financial Markets from the Instituto de Estudios Bursátiles (2009) in Madrid and a Master in Public Administration at Harvard University's John F. Kennedy School of Governmennt (2011). In addition, he joined the Centre d’études et de recherches internationales (CERI) of Sciences Po in Paris, France, as a research fellow in 2012 before completing a DPhil (PhD) in International Relations at the University of Oxford, with a particular focus on European security and defence (2016).

Career 

In 2014, Muñiz joined the Fundación Rafael del Pino in Madrid, Spain as Director of the Foundation’s Global Leadership Program with the goal of training Spanish leaders in the field of global affairs. In 2015, he worked as a consultant for the UN Support Mission in Libya and provided advice on security matters.

From 2015 to 2017, Muñiz was the Director of the Program on Transatlantic Relations at Harvard University's Weatherhead Center for International Affairs and, between 2016 and 2017, he was also a lecturer on the geopolitical consequences of the rise of populism at Tufts University. During this time, he was selected by Esglobal as one of the 25 intellectuals redefining Iberoamerican thought.

Muñiz was subsequently appointed a Senior Associate at Harvard University's Belfer Center for Science and International Affairs., where he was one of the promoters of the Project on Europe and the Transatlantic Relationship, aimed at strengthening the University’s capacities for teaching, research, and policy on the relationship between the United States and Europe.

In 2017, Dr. Muñiz became the Dean of the School of Global and Public Affairs and founded the IE Centre for the Governance of Change to examine the challenges exerted by accelerated societal and technological transformation on both the public and private sectors.

In January, 2020, the Council of Ministers of the Government of Spain approved Muñiz’s designation as Secretary of State for Global Spain, in replacement of Irene Lozano in the position and the powers of the State Secretariat were extended to include economic diplomacy with a marked emphasis on fighting the impact of COVID-19 on the Spanish economy. He assumed office on 7 February. Once in office, became part of the Committee of Experts advising the Spanish government on the COVID-19 pandemic.

Muñiz has coordinated the crafting Spain’s Foreign Action Strategy 2021-2024, and he has led the efforts for the composition of the first National Strategy on Technology and Global Order, a document which aims to launch Spain’s Technology Diplomacy. He has also led work at the OECD on the approval of a global mobility framework aimed at minimizing the economic impact of Covid 19, and was the coordinator of Spain’s OECD Ministerial Presidency during 2020. Muñiz was also a member of the Prime Minister’s Covid19 task force.  As the Foreign Ministry’s spokesperson, he has held a weekly appointment with the media through briefings with the Spanish and international press and has led the Ministry's communication efforts, including those aimed at improving Spain's image abroad. In this role, he has developed actions and reputation campaigns such as the two editions of ‘Spain for Sure’, ‘ParamiEspañaEs’ or ‘Local Heroes, Global Spaniards’. Before completing her post, he had begun the creation of the first country reputation action plan, which is intended to create the consensus and the tools to boost Spain's image abroad.

On July 11 2021, he voluntarily resigned from the post of Secretary of State for Global Spain, following the announcement of the dismissal of the hitherto minister, Arancha González Laya.

Research 
Dr. Muñiz started his academic career working on European integration, with a particular focus on transatlantic relations, security and defence. He has also studied what he terms the “Anti-Elite Era”, the rise of populism, and the implosion of the International Liberal Order. As part of that process of changes in the International Order he has looked at the role of China, and the Technological Cold War emerging between China and the United States.

Muñiz’s work has focused extensively on the impact of technology on the social contract and on the global order. His fundamental thesis is that rapid technological change has led to a fracturing of the social contract through the hollowing out of the Western middle class and, ultimately, the rise of populist politics. He has openly called for the crafting of a new Social Contract for the Digital Era in which inequities are addressed and technological change is governed through foresight and the development of a science of anticipation.

Essays 
Muñiz, M. (2020). “Diplomacia económica para un nuevo Contrato Social,” (Economic Diplomacy for a New Social Contract), El País

Muñiz, M. (2020).  “Tecnología y orden global,” (Technology and Global Order), Estudios de Politica Exterior, Issue 193, Enero/Febrero, pp. 2–14

Muñiz, M. (2019). “Orden Global, Tecnología y la Geopolítica del Cambio,” (Global Order, Technology and the Geopolitics of Change), Anuario Internacional CIDOB, pp. 16–24

Muñiz, M. (2019). “The Coming Technological Cold War,” Project Syndicate

Muñiz, M. (2017). “Economic Growth is No Longer Enough,” Project Syndicate

Muñiz, M., and Lastra, C. (2017). “Technological change, inequality and the collapse of the liberal order,” Economics, Discussion Paper

Muñiz, M., Kaiser, K., Lastra, C., Meyer, H., and Torres, M. (2017). “Technological Change, Inequality and the Collapse of the Liberal Order,” G20 Insights, Policy Brief

Muñiz, M. (2017). “El colapso del orden liberal,” (The Collapse of the Liberal Order), Estudios de Politica Exterior, Issue 175, Enero/Febrero, pp. 2–13

Muñiz, M. (2017). “Could Spain help fix Europe?,” The Washington Post

Muñiz, M. (2016). “Populism and the Need for a New Social Contract,” Social Europe

Muñiz, M. (2016). “La era anti-élites,” (The Anti-Elite Era), Estudios de Politica Exterior, Issue 172, Julio/Agosto, pp. 46–52

Muñiz, M. (2016). “Brexit and the anti-elite era,” Europe’s World

Muñiz, M., and LeGloannec, A.M (2014). ““Redefining the Transatlantic Security Relationship,” Transworld Working Paper, 38, pp. 1–29

Monographs and book chapters 
Muniz, M (2020). “A New Social Contract for the Digital Age,” in The Work Revolution, BBVA Open Mind, Turner, pp. 106–118

Muniz, M (2019). “La Implosión del Orden Liberal,” (The Implosion of the Liberal Order), in “Gobernanza futura: hiperglobalización, mundo multipolar y Estados menguantes,” Cuaderno de Estrategia, 199, Instituto Español de Estudios Estratégicos

Muniz, M (2018). “The Governance of Change: How Companies and Governments Should Adapt to Technological Disruption,” in  Iñiguez, Santiago and Kazuo, Ichijo eds. Business Despite Borders, Palgrave McMillan, pp. 21–33

Muniz, M (2016). “Explaining security and defence integration: the case of Europe,” [PhD thesis]. University of Oxford

References

External links 
 Personal website

Interview 
La nueva Estrategia de Acción Exterior aboga por una “diplomacia feminista”. 26/1/21 https://elpais.com/espana/2021-01-26/la-nueva-estrategia-de-accion-exterior-aboga-por-una-diplomacia-feminista.html

Moncloa prepara una reforma estructural de Exteriores y de toda la carrera diplomática. 26/01/21. https://www.elconfidencial.com/mundo/europa/2021-01-26/moncloa-prepara-reforma-integral-exteriores-carrera-diplomatica_2922259/

El Gobierno se lanza a por fondos soberanos para transformar la economía https://cincodias.elpais.com/cincodias/2020/12/22/companias/1608664383_828462.html

Manuel Muñiz, secretario de Estado de España Global: "Abriremos corredores seguros para el turismo" https://www.expansion.com/economia/politica/2020/10/18/5f8cb2fc468aeb1f508b45b4.html

Manuel Muñiz: “Seguimos siendo uno de los países más atractivos del mundo” https://www.rtve.es/alacarta/audios/marca-espana/marca-espana-manuel-muniz-seguimos-siendo-uno-paises-mas-atractivos-del-mundo-07-09-20/5657894/

Manuel Muñiz: "La imagen de España es mejor de lo que la gente cree" https://www.elmundo.es/espana/2020/08/11/5f31665521efa0dd198b4604.html

Manuel Muñiz: “El plan europeo es absolutamente vital para España” https://www.niusdiario.es/economia/macroeconomia/manuel-muniz-entrevista-secretario-estado-espana-global-plan-europeo-ayudas-vital-para-crisis-covid_18_2979120251.html

Diplomacia económica para un nuevo contrato social https://elpais.com/opinion/2020-07-05/un-nuevo-contrato-social.html

Manuel Muñiz: "El criterio para abrir fronteras con terceros países será estrictamente sanitario" https://www.ondacero.es/programas/julia-en-la-onda/audios-podcast/entrevistas/manuel-muniz_202006295efa0f613c943200016986a8.html

Manuel Muñiz: “A España le toca una etapa fuerte de diplomacia económica para asegurar la recuperación” https://cincodias.elpais.com/cincodias/2020/06/17/economia/1592416666_461220.html

Complutense University of Madrid alumni
Spanish academic administrators
Deans (academic)
Spanish officials of the United Nations
Spanish expatriates in the United Kingdom
Academic staff of IE University
Alumni of the University of Oxford
Spanish expatriates in the United States
Harvard Kennedy School alumni
Spanish expatriates in France
Living people
21st-century Spanish lawyers
Government ministers of Spain
Expatriate academics in the United States
1983 births
Secretaries of State of Spain